Pepsinogen A is a protein that in humans is encoded by the PGA5 gene.

References

Further reading